Barut  is a village in the administrative district of Gmina Jemielnica, within Strzelce County, Opole Voivodeship, in south-western Poland.

References

Villages in Strzelce County